Les Innommables ("The Unnameables") is a Franco-Belgian comic series written by Yann le Pennetier and drawn by Didier Conrad. It began publication in serialized form in 1980 in Spirou magazine and was eventually published in album form by Dargaud. 

The series recounts the adventures of three U.S. Army deserters – Mac, Tony and Tim – in 1949, as they trek across Asia and search for Alix, who is Mac's lover and a Chinese communist spy. Les Innommables is characterized by its black humor as well as frequent displays of nudity and violence – which eventually ended the series' run in Spirou.

The first edition of the album Alix-Noni-Tengu contained two alternative endings. In re-editions, only the second ending was retained. The character of Alix was made the subject of a six-volume spin-off series, Tigresse blanche.

Les Innommables has been translated into German (Helden ohne Skrupel) and Dutch (De onnoembaren). The album Pas-de-mâchoire was nominated for the 2001 Angoulême International Comics Festival Prize for Scenario.

Albums 
The initial volumes Aventure en jaune and Shukumeï were published in 1983 by Temps Futurs and in 1987 by Bédéscope, respectively. The entire series was published by Dargaud from 1996 to 2004:

Shukumeï, 2002
 Le Cycle du Hong Kong
Aventure en jaune, 1996
Le Crâne du Père Zé, 1994
 Le Cycle du Lotus Pourpre
Ching Soao, 1995
Au Lotus Pourpre, 1995
Alix-Noni-Tengu, 1996
 Le Cycle de Corée
Cloaques, 1997
Poupée de bronze, 1998
Pas-de-Mâchoire, 2000
Le Cycle U.S.A.
À l'est de Roswell, 2002
Au nord de White Sands, 2003
Au sud-ouest de Moscou, 2004

A black-and-white magazine supplement, Matricule triple zéro (1996), takes place prior to the events of the albums, and recounts the desertion of the three protagonists.

References

Bandes dessinées
1980 comics debuts
Comics characters introduced in 1980
Belgian comic strips
Adventure comics
Comics set in the 1940s
Comics set in the 1950s
Dargaud titles
Belgian comics characters